Update(s) or Updated may refer to:

Music
 Update (Anouk album), 2004
 Update (Berlin Jazz Orchestra album), 2004
 Update (Jane Zhang album), 2007
 Update (Mal Waldron album), 1987
 Update (Yandel album), 2017
 Updated (M. Pokora album), an English-language version of Mise à jour, 2011

Other uses
 Update (SQL), a statement for changing database records
 Updates, a program broadcast by CNN Philippines
 Bayesian inference, a type of reasoning also described as updating

See also
 Patch (computing), also known as a software update